Hillcrest may refer to:
Hillcrest, Little Rock, Arkansas, in Pulaski County
Hillcrest, Johnson County, Arkansas
Hillcrest, Mississippi County, Arkansas